Four justices of the seven-member North Carolina Supreme Court and four judges of the 15-member North Carolina Court of Appeals were elected by North Carolina voters on November 4, 2014, concurrently with other state elections. Terms for seats on each court are eight years.

Assessing the election results, Politifact writer Louis Jacobson noted that Supreme Court races in North Carolina and other states yielded "better-than-average results" for Democrats, who otherwise suffered heavy defeats across the country. "In a series of hotly contested North Carolina contests, two Democratic-leaning judges [Ervin and Hudson] prevailed, one Democrat [Beasley] was leading in a very close race, and one Republican [Chief Justice Martin] was re-elected," Jacobson wrote. At the Court of Appeals level, two Democrats, Lucy Inman and Mark Davis, and one Republican, John Tyson, were elected in contested races, while another Republican, Donna Stroud, was re-elected without opposition.

North Carolina ranked second among all states in total spending on judicial election campaigns in 2014.

Supreme Court (Chief Justice)
Chief Justice Sarah Parker stepped down from her position on the Court in 2014 because she reached the mandatory retirement age of 72. Her seat would have been on the November 2014 election ballot in any event, since she was elected Chief Justice in 2006 to an eight-year term.

Candidates
Mark Martin (Republican), incumbent Chief Justice of the Supreme Court of North Carolina
Ola Lewis (Republican), Brunswick County Superior Court judge

Polling

Results

Supreme Court (Martin seat)
The seat formerly held by Associate Justice Mark Martin was on the ballot. Justice Martin was appointed to the position of chief justice, effective Sept. 1, and ran for that seat.

Candidates
Sam J. Ervin IV (Democratic), incumbent Judge of the North Carolina Court of Appeals (2009–2014)
Robert N. Hunter, Jr. (Republican), incumbent Associate Justice of the Supreme Court of North Carolina

Polling

Results

Supreme Court (Hudson seat)
Associate Justice Robin E. Hudson ran for re-election to a second term.

Candidates
Jeanette Doran (Republican), chair of the North Carolina Division of Employment Security Board of Review
Robin E. Hudson (Democratic), incumbent Associate Justice of the Supreme Court of North Carolina
Eric L. Levinson (Republican), Mecklenburg County Superior Court judge

Primary election

Results

General election

Polling

Results

Supreme Court (Beasley seat)
Associate Justice Cheri Beasley ran for election to a full term in her own right after she was appointed to the seat by former Governor Bev Perdue to fill a vacancy.

Beasley won election to her first full term with 50.1 percent of the vote. The margin was small enough that a recount would be allowed, if Robinson requested it. He filed such a request for a recount on Nov. 17. After the recount only added a net 17 votes to Robinson's total, he conceded and Beasley was declared the winner on Nov. 25.

Candidates
Cheri Beasley (Democratic), incumbent Associate Justice of the Supreme Court of North Carolina
Mike Robinson (Republican), private practice attorney

Polling

Results

Court of Appeals (Robert C. Hunter seat)
The seat held by Judge Robert C. Hunter (not to be confused with his colleague on the Court, Robert N. Hunter, Jr.) was on the ballot. Hunter announced on Aug. 14, 2013, that he would not seek re-election.

Judges Lucy Inman and Bill Southern were both candidates for the seat. Judge Inman is a special Superior Court judge and was appointed to that position in 2010 by former Governor Beverly Perdue. Prior to that, she was a trial lawyer. Judge Southern currently serves on the District Court bench for Stokes and Surry Counties. He was elected to that position in 2008 and in 2012. Prior to that, he served as an assistant district attorney in Stokes and Surry Counties.

Inman won election to her first term on the North Carolina Court of Appeals with 51.9 percent of the vote.

Polling

Results

Court of Appeals (Stroud seat)
Judge Donna Stroud ran unopposed for re-election.

Results

Court of Appeals (Davis seat)
Judge Mark A. Davis ran for a full term after serving out the remainder of Judge Cheri Beasley's unexpired term. Beasley was appointed to the Supreme Court.

District Court Judge Paul A. Holcombe also ran for this seat. Paul Holcombe has been a District Court Judge for Johnston, Harnett and Lee Counties since January 2009.

Davis won his first full term by taking 58.8 percent of the vote.

Polling

Results

Court of Appeals (John C. Martin seat)
On July 9, 2014, Chief Judge John C. Martin announced his retirement, effective August 1, 2014, creating another opening to be filled by voters in the general election. Because of the date of his retirement, no primary election was held for the seat. Governor Pat McCrory appointed Judge Lisa Bell to hold the Martin seat for the remainder of the year, but she was not among the candidates who ran for a full term.

Nineteen candidates filed for the special election. They included former Court of Appeals Judge John Arrowood of Charlotte, Raleigh attorney Betsy Bunting, District Court Judge Lori G. Christian, Raleigh bankruptcy attorney Jeffrey Cook, Raleigh Deputy Industrial Commissioner and former Court of Appeals staff lawyer J. Brad Donovan, Hertford attorney Daniel Patrick Donahue, Raleigh attorney Sabra Faires, former Superior Court judge Abe Jones, New Bern attorney Ann Kirby, Deputy Industrial Commissioner Keischa Lovelace, Raleigh attorney Marty Martin, Haywood County trial attorney Hunter Murphy, 
Raleigh attorney Joseph "Jody" Newsome, Raleigh attorney Patricia "Tricia" Shields, Raleigh attorney Elizabeth Davenport Scott, former Court of Appeals Judge John M. Tyson of Cumberland County, Brunswick County District Court Judge Marion Warren, Greensboro attorney and former State Board of Elections member Chuck Winfree, and Yadkinville attorney Valerie Johnson Zachary.

Judge Tyson won his second full term on the court with 23.9 percent of the vote. Arrowood placed second with 14.4 percent. No other candidate took more than 10 percent of the vote.

Results

References

State Board of Elections: Judicial Officeholders

External links
State Board of Elections: General Election Judicial Voter Guide
Videos of Judicial Candidate Forums by UNC-TV

judicial
2014